"OTW" (an acronym for "on the way") is a song by American singers Khalid, Ty Dolla Sign, and 6lack. The artists wrote the song with Brian Alexander Morgan, Idan Kalai and producer Nineteen85. It was released by RCA Records on April 20, 2018 as a stand-alone single, before being added as a bonus track to the vinyl of Khalid's EP Suncity (2018).

Release
On March 31, 2018, Khalid posted a snippet of the song on Twitter. He officially announced the single during the nominations announcement for the 2018 Billboard Music Awards.

Composition
"OTW" is a dark and melodic R&B song with '90s influences. It features a "silky smooth" and "mellow" production, backed by "a trap-infused R&B beat". A booty-call theme channels throughout the track, as the artists sing about meeting up with a love interest.

Critical reception
Michael Love Michael of Paper regarded the song as "a refreshing slice of smooth, radio-ready, but throwback '90s R&B". He praised the song's "undercurrent of bittersweet melancholy characteristic of the genre's most forward-thinking productions", describing it as "an addictively rhythmic tune". MTV News' Ross McNeilage wrote: "The slick and sultry track is a nice extension from the sound of his debut album, and 6LACK and Ty Dolla $ign complement the song perfectly." Devin Ch of HotNewHipHop praised Khalid's songwriting talents, writing that "all performers adhere to the general 'vibe' of the song". Lauren O'Neill of Noisey described the song as a destined summer track, writing that it "feels most like a head massage you'll hear all week". He complimented Khalid's ability to produce a "relentlessly catchy but also somehow extremely laid back hook".

Music video
The music video for "OTW", directed by Calmatic, premiered via Khalid's Vevo channel on July 3, 2018.

Credits and personnel
Credits adapted from Tidal.
 Nineteen85 – production
 Eazy - vocal engineer
 Denis Kosiak – mix engineer, record engineer
 Chris Athens – master engineer
 Andy Barnes – record engineer
 JT Gagarin – record engineer

Charts

Weekly charts

Year-end charts

Certifications

Release history

References

2018 singles
2018 songs
Khalid (singer) songs
Ty Dolla Sign songs
6lack songs
Songs written by Khalid (singer)
Songs written by Ty Dolla Sign
Songs written by 6lack
Song recordings produced by Nineteen85
Songs written by Nineteen85
Songs written by Brian Alexander Morgan
RCA Records singles